The 2020 season was South East Stars' first season, in which they competed in the 50 over Rachael Heyhoe Flint Trophy following reforms to the structure of women's domestic cricket in England. The side finished third in the South Group of the competition, winning two of their six matches.

After the ending of the Women's Cricket Super League in 2019, the ECB announced the beginning of a new "women's elite domestic structure". Eight teams were included in this new structure, with South East Stars being one of the new teams, replacing Surrey Stars and representing London and South East England. Due to the impact of the COVID-19 pandemic, only the Rachael Heyhoe Flint Trophy was able to take place. South East Stars were captained by Tash Farrant and coached by Jonathan Batty. They played two of their home matches at the County Ground, Beckenham and one at The Oval.

Squad
South East Stars named their squad for the season on 18 August 2020. Age given is at the start of South East Stars' first match of the season (29 August 2020).

Rachael Heyhoe Flint Trophy

South Group

 Advanced to the Final.

Fixtures

Statistics

Batting

Bowling

Fielding

Wicket-keeping

References

South East Stars seasons
2020 in English women's cricket